Allotinus otsukai is a butterfly in the family Lycaenidae. It was described by Takanami and Seki in 1990. It is found on Borneo.

References

Butterflies described in 1990
Allotinus
Butterflies of Borneo